Friedrich Wolf (21 January 1880 – 27 August 1961) was a German gymnast who competed in the 1908 Summer Olympics. In 1908 he finished fifth in the all-around competition.

References

1880 births
1961 deaths
German male artistic gymnasts
Olympic gymnasts of Germany
Gymnasts at the 1908 Summer Olympics